Iñaki Aldekoa Azarloza (1940 – 8 April 2021) was a Spanish abertzale politician who served as a deputy.

Born in Amorebieta-Etxano, he was previously an industrial engineer by profession.

References

1940 births
2021 deaths
Members of the 3rd Congress of Deputies (Spain)
Members of the 1st Parliament of Navarre
People from Amorebieta-Etxano
Politicians from the Basque Country (autonomous community)
Herri Batasuna politicians
Members of the 2nd Parliament of Navarre